"Iron Fist" is a song by the British heavy metal band Motörhead. It was released as a single in 1982, in 7" pressings in blue, black and translucent red vinyl.

The title track on the single is covered with (B-side's) "Remember Me, I'm Gone", which appears on CD re-issues of the Iron Fist album. In Spain, the title track was put on the B-side of "Go to Hell" and was issued with a picture sleeve of the band dressed as warriors in skull masks.

This is the last single featuring the classic Motörhead line-up of Lemmy, "Fast" Eddie Clarke and Phil "Philthy Animal" Taylor, as Clarke left following the recording of the Stand By Your Man EP.

On 27 March 1982, Lemmy, Clarke and Taylor were interviewed by Tommy Vance on BBC Radio 1's 'Rock on Saturday' show, "Iron Fist", "Loser", and "Speedfreak" were played.

Single track listing
 "Iron Fist" (Eddie Clarke, Ian Kilmister, Phil Taylor) – 2:50
 "Remember Me, I'm Gone" (Kilmister, Clarke, Taylor) – 2:26

Personnel
 "Fast" Eddie Clarke – guitars, vocals
 Phil "Philthy Animal" Taylor – drums
 Lemmy (Ian Kilmister) – bass, lead vocals

Cover versions
The Finnish folk metal band Korpiklaani covered the song on their 2011 album Ukon Wacka. The US-American hardcore band Pro-Pain covered the song on their 2003 album Run For Cover. The German Thrash metal band Sodom also covered the song on their album Persecution Mania. A live version is on the compilation album Ten Black Years. Cleveland, Ohio thrash band Ringworm covered Iron Fist on a 2016 split they did with Early Graves. Metal Allegiance also covered this song on their 2016 EP Fallen Heroes.

References

External links
 Sample of the song at the Motörhead Official Site (RealPlayer required).

Motörhead songs
1982 singles
Songs written by Lemmy
Songs written by Eddie Clarke (musician)
Songs written by Phil Taylor (musician)
1982 songs
Bronze Records singles